Brando Mehdi Mahdloo Torkaman is an American-Italian actor, writer, screenwriter, model and startupper. In January 2021, he was included in the "best 2020 models and actors" list by the international magazine "Arts Tribune".

Private life 
Mahdloo (full name Brando Mehdi Mahdloo Torkaman) was born in Rome, Italy on September 11, 1985, and very little is known about his private life. Mahdloo himself never quite speaks about it.

He spent most of his childhood and teenage time in Rome, but his family often moved from city to city in Italy.

During an interview released years ago for "La Repubblica", Mahdloo spoke about a hard and very particular childhood, never going into details though. He said "It was very hard. When I look back ...what I've been through. But it was worth it."

Mahdloo lives and travels between Italy and England, and often refers to London as "my place in the world". Since 2007, Mahdloo has been an active member of the Italian Red Cross which operates rescue teams and ambulances alongside the Italian emergency services.

Actor career

From theatre stage to cinema. 
He started acting at ten. The success of his first play (a revised version of Othello, by William Shakespeare) prompted him to pursue an acting career, attending renowned courses and workshops. He trained with the Stanislavskij-Strasberg method, Mahdloo has a very rigorous and profound approach to the assigned roles. In an interview with "XL", back in 2013, he talks about acting as a sacred vocation.

Words he puts into practice with his performances, where he highlights his ability to immerse himself deeply in the parts, often undergoing very radical transformations. His first professional movie comes in 2010, with "The Invisible City" directed by Giuseppe Tandoi, where he plays Marco, an Italian soldier involved in the aftermath of the sadly famous earthquake that hit L'Aquila (Italy) on April 6, 2009.

The next year, Mahdloo got his first leading role in the famous movie "What a Beautiful Day" (now available on Netflix), directed by Gennaro Nunziante and starring Checco Zalone, which has been the biggest box-office hit in Italian cinema history, grossing over 43 million euros and overtaking Avatar and Harry Potter.

For his performance in What a Beautiful Day, Brando Mahdloo received several awards, including the prestigious "Age".

In 2011, he also starred as the leading actor in two short movies: Alone, Facing a Crossroads, in the role of Luke, which earned him the Best Actor Award at the Vasto Film Festival; and Birthday Letter directed by Luca Annovi, broadcast on Sky channels.

The same year, he published his first book titled "The Treasure of Mc J Roger".

Mahdloo has also twice won the "Hombres" Literary award: in 2009 with "Between Good and Evil"; and in 2010 with "Dedicated to the Death", two short novels.

In 2013, he starred as Jesus Christ (lead role) in Ameluk, a movie about cultural integration, religions, and racial discrimination, with a huge cast filled with big Italian names.

The movie was first released in 2015 in theatres and it's now available on Amazon Prime Video.

In 2014, Brando Mehdi Mahdloo starred in the new short by Luca Annovi, titled "Amor-E".  The short is about the love between a guy and the Moon. A love as impossible as it is powerful. The Italian press loved his performance and a sequel is in preparation for the upcoming Festival del Cinema di Venezia.

In 2015, Brando Mehdi Mahdloo starred in Stalking Eva, a thriller movie by Joe Verni. Mahdloo plays Tom, a bad and extroverted photographer, interested only in his evil purposes. The movie was released in Italy on September 24, 2016, and was hailed as a big success.

In 2017 he joined the cast of the series “SOLO” in the second season, on Canale 5. His performance has been considered one of the best in an Italian tv series by critics.

Since 2011, Mahdloo is the face of the Italian Red Cross' national advertising campaign.

Startup career 

Mahdloo always pursued his acting career with his second vocation in mind: Startups.

He started his first startup, "Letter", back in 2013 and started developing a new revolutionary messaging app for iOS devices.

Very little is known about the app, but in an interview with "AbruzzoWeb" in April 2018, Mahdloo speaks about "Letter" as a new way to communicate, completely different from every single messaging app available on mobile devices.

"Letter" was never officially released due to unknown reasons.

In 2019 Mahdloo and several other entrepreneurs, founded "MUSH!", a new startup that aims to revolutionize the market with a new food product, never seen before. "MUSH! " is expected to hit the market in May 2021.

In 2020, Brando Mahdloo becomes the COO of ESB Link, a multi-service startup that developed an innovative managing platform for the Italian fiscal "Superbonus 110%".

Filmography

 La Città Invisibile (2010)
 Che Bella Giornata (2011)  
 Alone, Facing a Crossroads (2011) (short)
 Birthday Letter (2011) (short)
 Ameluk (2014)
 Amor-E (2014) (short)
 Stalking Eva (2015)
 SOLO - Season 2 (tv series) (2018)

Books 
 The Treasure of Mc J Roger (2011) (published by Arduino Sacco Editore)

References

External links

1985 births
Living people
Male actors from Rome
Italian male film actors
Italian male models